The Embassy of India is located in the Liangmaqiao area of Chaoyang District, Beijing. The embassy is located within a US$10 million,  facility in proximity to various office buildings, the Embassy of the United States, and the Embassy of Israel. The embassy is commuted through Liangmaqiao subway station.

History 

The Indian mission originally occupied the Beijing Legation Quarter. The facility received damage during the Cultural Revolution. Around that period many diplomatic missions began moving to specified diplomatic enclaves. In 1969 the embassy moved to a location near Ritan Park in Chaoyang. The Ritan embassy, which the mission had moved into in 1969, was a wooden two-story structure. Ananth Krishnan of The Hindu said the old embassy was "old-fashioned and increasingly cramped". While the Ritan embassy operated, 29 diplomats, 28 Chinese employees, and 33 non-diplomat Indian employees worked in the embassy. The Indian government purchased a land site, which houses the current embassy, in 1989 for a 90-year lease for around $1 million USD.

Current building 
The current embassy opened in 2012. The inauguration ceremony occurred on Wednesday 8 February 2012. S.M. Krishna, the External Affairs Minister, attended the ceremony.

See also 
 China–India relations
 Foreign relations of China
 Foreign relations of India
 List of diplomatic missions of India
 List of diplomatic missions in China

References

External links 

 Embassy of India, Beijing

Beijing
India
China–India relations